Anthony Patterson (born 10 May 2000) is an English professional footballer who plays as a goalkeeper for  club Sunderland.

Playing career
Patterson sat on the bench during the 2018–19 season and was given a contract in July 2019. He made his competitive first-team debut on 10 November 2020, in a 2–1 defeat at Fleetwood Town in an EFL Trophy group stage fixture. He made one further appearance in the 2021–22 season and having impressed head coach Lee Johnson, Patterson signed a new two-year deal, with the option of an additional year, in June 2021. Sporting Director Kristjaan Speakman said that he now considered Patterson "as a member of the first-team squad" with Lee Burge as the only other senior goalkeeper at the Stadium of Light.

Notts County (loan) 
In September 2021 Patterson Joined Notts County on loan until the end of October after Sunderland completed the signing of Ron-Thorben Hoffmann on loan from Bayern Munich on deadline day.

Return to Sunderland 
His loan was extended till the end of January. However Lee Johnson recalled the goalkeeper due to injury to Sunderlands 2nd choice Goalkeeper Lee Burge. On December 31 Lee Johnson sent Patterson back to Notts County till end of Season. On January 7 Patterson was recalled from Notts County with the possibility of the loan being resumed later in the window. Patterson established himself as Sunderland's first-choice goalkeeper for the second half of the season, featuring in Sunderland's successful play-off campaign as they defeated Wycombe Wanderers 2–0 in the final.

Patterson signed a new long-term contract with the club in June 2022, keeping him at the club until 2026.

Style of play
Sunderland goalkeeper coach Lee Butler said that Patterson had great saving, handling and shot-stopping ability, with his weaknesses being coming for crosses, his distribution and his communication.

Career statistics

Honours

Sunderland
 EFL League One play-offs: 2022
Personal

 North East Football Writers' Association young player of the year

References

2000 births
Living people
Sportspeople from North Shields
Footballers from Tyne and Wear
English footballers
Association football goalkeepers
Sunderland A.F.C. players
English Football League players